Swinden Quarry is  north of the village of Cracoe, and  south-west of Grassington in North Yorkshire, England. It is owned by LaFarge Tarmac.  The former Skipton-Grassington railway line still serves this location, and in railway terminology, the site is known as Rylstone Quarry.

Swinden Quarry railway yard is near the village of Cracoe, at the northern end of the old Skipton to Grassington line built by the Yorkshire Dales Railway.  It is now the terminus of the line as the portion north of there to the former terminus at Threshfield was closed in 1969 and subsequently lifted (the B6265 road now passes across the old formation just beyond the buffer stops).

Quarry details 

The quarry is set deep into the landscape and despite some surface workings being visible from the B6265 road, most of the site is hidden as a result of it being dug down out of a hill. Much of the industrial plant machinery was moved from the exterior of the plant and into the quarry workings, so that they are hidden by the high surrounding banks of the quarry itself.

Products exported from the site include roadstone, agricultural lime, industrial carbonate, crushed rock aggregate & pre-cast concrete products. A significant tonnage of the quarried material is exported from the site by rail, although there can be up to 42,000 lorry journeys on the B6265 per year. As part of a proposal to extend the life of the quarry beyond 2030, the owners have indicated a greater reliance on rail transport with a consistent reduction of lorry movements.

The site has been designated as an SSSI, as the quarrying has exposed the Carboniferous Limestone and shows how the stone developed through the different beds of rock.

The rail loading area is used as a park and ride facility for the annual Christmas festival at Grassington.

Railfreight services 
Limestone services from the quarry are operated to Dewsbury, Dairycoates (Hull) and Marsh Lane/Hunslet (Leeds) by GB Railfreight. GB Railfreight also operate train services of limestone to Small Heath and Wellingborough.

See also 
 Tarmac

References

External links 

 Tarmac official site on Swinden Quarry.

Craven District
Quarries in North Yorkshire
Wharfedale
Sites of Special Scientific Interest in North Yorkshire
Rail-served quarries in England